Cantar es lo que soy (English: Singing is who I am) is the second soundtrack album of the TV series Violetta.

Background 
The album was recorded during the filming of the first season of the television series. 
It was released in Latin America on November 29, 2012. The album contains one CD with 10 tracks and one DVD with 9 music videos of their most popular songs.

In Italy the album was released on March 18, 2013 and was renamed Violetta: La musica è il mio mondo with 11 tracks, one more than the original with the re-release of the song "En mi mundo" in Italian. The album reached number one on the first week.

The album has been certified Triple Platinum in Argentina, Platinum in Uruguay, Gold in Venezuela, Colombia and Chile.

The album was released in Spain under the name ''Violetta: La Música es mi Mundo.

Track listing

Latin American edition

Italy edition

France edition

Charts and certifications

Charts

Certifications

|-

References 

2012 soundtrack albums
Violetta (TV series)
Television soundtracks
Walt Disney Records soundtracks